"Because I Got High" is a song by American rapper Afroman from his eponymous album. The lyrics of the song humorously describe how cannabis use is degrading the narrator's quality of life. The song, which was written in only a few minutes, rose from obscurity to popularity after it was circulated around the Internet and was featured on The Howard Stern Show.

Overview

The song explains how the narrator "got high" with the result of not taking responsibility for anything. Examples include neglecting to clean his room, failing his college class (which he intends to take next semester), getting fired from his job (leading him to resort to selling marijuana for a living), missing court dates, having his paycheck garnished due to missed child support payments, gambling away his car payment, becoming a paraplegic as the result of a police chase, and being left by his wife for neglecting to have sex with her. The singer then sums up that, as a result of his constant reliance on cannabis, he lost custody of his children, lost his wife, and ended up homeless and "sleeping on the sidewalk". He ultimately decides to end the song, and admits that he is "singing the whole thing wrong, because [he is] high". The extended version features another verse afterward: "Well my name is Afroman, and I'm from East Palmdale / And all the tumbleweed I be smoking is bomb as hell / I don't believe in Hitler, that's what I said / So all of you skins... please give me more head" (the last two lines are a reference to John Lennon's "God" and a pun on "skinheads", respectively). This version ends with Afroman saying, "We ain't gonna sell none of these motherfuckin' albums cuz... let's go back to Marshall Durbin and hang some more chickens cuz, fuck it", followed by "Fuck the corporate world, biatch!".

The music video was directed by Michael Alperowitz and features Kevin Smith and Jason Mewes as Jay and Silent Bob smoking with Afroman, a cameo by "Beer Man", as well as a glimpse of the Quick Stop where Clerks was filmed.

Reception
Afroman released his album Because I Got High in 2000; he distributed it mainly through concerts. The title track was soon posted on file-sharing service Napster and made it to The Howard Stern Show. This song was the theme song of the film Jay and Silent Bob Strike Back and was later featured in the films Disturbia, A Thousand Words, The Perfect Score and the Snowpiercer show.

After the success of this single, Afroman was signed to Universal Records.

On the album Mobilize by punk band Anti-Flag, after several minutes of silence on the album's end track, a friend of the band called Spaz can be heard singing parts of the song with Anti-Flag.

Track listing

Alternative versions 
Afroman re-recorded the song with new lyrics for his 2009 album Frobama Head of State. A second re-recording of the song, called the "Positive Remix", was released by Afroman through YouTube on October 15, 2014 as part of a collaboration with Weedmaps and NORML. In contrast to the original version, the lyrics of this version deal with the positive effects of marijuana legalization.

A song with a similar theme was released by Detroit Junior in 1980, titled "If I Hadn't Been High."

Parodies
Bob Rivers included a Christmas-themed version, Be Claus I Got High, on the 2002 album White Trash Christmas, the fifth in Rivers's line of Christmas parody albums.

BBC Radio 1 DJ Chris Moyles recorded a parody under the pseudonym "Afro-Blair" featuring Jon Culshaw and another impressionist singing in the guise of the serving Prime Minister Tony Blair, then Leader of the Opposition William Hague and former Prime Ministers John Major and Margaret Thatcher.

The controversial parody artist Rucka Rucka Ali made a version of the song called "Because I'm White" about stereotypes of White Americans and white privilege in general.

A parody was made about British politician Michael Gove after his scandal involving cocaine use.

Charts

Weekly charts

Year-end charts

Decade-end charts

Certifications

References

External links
 

2001 debut singles
2001 songs
Afroman songs
Comedy rap songs
Irish Singles Chart number-one singles
Number-one singles in Austria
Number-one singles in Denmark
Number-one singles in Germany
Number-one singles in New Zealand
Number-one singles in Norway
Number-one singles in Scotland
Songs about cannabis
UK Singles Chart number-one singles
Universal Records singles
Uptown Records singles
American works about cannabis